National is a ghost town in Carbon County, Utah, United States. It is located along upper Gordon Creek.

History

Coal was discovered in the area in 1908, but large-scale mining did not begin until the National Coal Company purchased the mines in the 1920s. All of the buildings in National were constructed of the same brick material. In 1921, the National Coal Company, together with the Gordon Creek Coal Company, built a railroad line from Helper to the mining operations. In July 1938, the National Coal Company discontinued mining operations in the area. The mine was sold under foreclosure by the end of the year. All of the mining equipment that had value was sold. Mining continued under a new owner for a short time, but the town was soon abandoned. A few foundations and deteriorating buildings remain in National.

National is located less than a mile from the ghost towns of Consumers and Sweets; the three towns shared a post office, school house, hospital and amusement hall.  National is also only a few miles away from the ghost town of Coal City.

See also
List of ghost towns in Utah
Coal mining in the United States

References

Ghost towns in Carbon County, Utah
Populated places established in 1921
Mining communities in Utah
Ghost towns in Utah